Henry Peter Gyrich is a fictional character appearing in American comic books published by Marvel Comics. He is a liaison of the United States government who is against the superhuman community.

Publication history
The character first appeared in Avengers Vol. 1 #165 (November 1977) and was created by writer Jim Shooter and penciller John Byrne.

Fictional character biography
Henry Gyrich is the first person to be given the title of US Government liaison to the Avengers by the National Security Agency later by the National Security Council. With his status, Gyrich is one of only two people (the other being the President of the United States) who could affect the Avengers in many difficult ways. During his tenure, Gyrich revokes the Avengers' priority status after taking issue. The Avengers have to accept Gyrich's "suggestions" or have their Quinjets and other sensitive equipment confiscated. He limits the Avengers' active membership to seven members, forces the Falcon to join unwillingly to fill an affirmative action quota Gyrich sets, and installs various security measures for the team Gyrich oversees the Avengers' activities for the next several months without incident, until he forbids the team to go on a mission to help Quicksilver. The next incident involves a security leak. Gyrich takes part in a Senate investigation involving the Avengers which claims the team are national security threats. When the investigation ends, the Senate committee gives the Avengers new guidelines to follow, and the committee designates Raymond Sikorski as his successor.

Writer Peter David attempted to humanize Henry by giving a backstory which touched upon Gyrich's family life. After Betty Banner criticizes Gyrich for appearing callous and unfeeling when mentioning the pain of Thunderbolt Ross dying, Gyrich cuts Banner off, saying "My father died of Alzheimer's, [Betty]. I took a year's leave to care for him so he wouldn't be watched over by strangers that my crummy salary couldn't even afford. I cleaned up after him, tended to him, and his last words as I cradled his dying body were, 'Who in heck are you?'"; Avengers: The Initiative later revealed that Gyrich's greatest fear is contracting the same disease that killed his father.

Prior to his involvement with the Avengers, Gyrich was NSA Liaison to Canada's Department H. While there, he met and had repeated issues with Canada's chief agent Wolverine.

Gyrich becomes a member of the Commission of Superhuman Activities (CSA), the oversight body on superhuman activities in the United States; he's part of the team that forces Captain America to resign. Gyrich also takes part as a special consultant in a covert government designed to deal with the problems concerning mutants in the United States. The project is instrumental in creating a mutant team to counter the foreign mutants threat.

Dire Wraith
Henry Gyrich is later involved in war efforts against the Dire Wraith extraterrestrials. This time, he works alongside the mutant Forge who works as a weapons maker for the US government and S.H.I.E.L.D. Gyrich takes Forge's specially designed superhuman power-neutralizing gun to capture the mutant Rogue for breaking into a facility S.H.I.E.L.D. In an encounter with Rogue, Storm and government forces, Gyrich accidentally shoots Storm and his specialized weapon strips Storm's powers and abilities as a mutant (but Storm's powers return some time later). Gyrich continues attempting to use Forge's own version of Spaceknight Rom's Neutralizer, planning to use an orbital version to wipe out all superpowers on Earth. Rom and Forge stop him, however, and he can only watch while tied up as Rom banishes Wraithworld (the Dire Wraith's home world) instead of destroying all the heroes and villains. Gyrich is also involved in hunting the Hulk after Onslaught's events.

Hunted by others
Henry Gyrich is targeted for assassination by the current form of the Mutant Liberation Front (MLF), led by the energy-casting Reignfire. His lack of gratitude for being rescued is part of what led the mutant Feral to defect from X-Force to the MLF. Gyrich is a key player in Bastion's program. He is a faithful believer in the operation until he himself becomes a target of Prime Sentinels. After being rescued by Spider-Man, Marrow and Callisto, Gyrich demands the program be shut down.

Political exploits
Gyrich is promoted to be Valerie Cooper's successor as the CSA's head. While there, Baron Strucker secretly places Gyrich under the control of nanites. Gyrich uses Commission resources and remolds the vigilante Nomad into the assassin Scourge and attempts to live out his "fantasy" of killing all the world's superhumans, before being stopped by the Thunderbolts.

Following that incident, he's reassigned to the US State Department and is made the Black Panther's liaison as well as the Avengers' new liaison to the United Nations (by Captain America's suggestion). During this time, he redeems himself in the eyes of the team when he refuses to deliver information on the Avengers to the Red Skull (disguised as the Secretary of Defense Dell Rusk). He never breaks, even under severe torture, which impressed the others. Now a faithful liaison officer to the Avengers, Gyrich's job comes to an end after the United Nations' relationship with the Avengers ends.

Following the Civil War storyline, Gyrich has become the Secretary of the Superhuman Armed Forces. His base of operations is the superhuman training facility in Stamford, Connecticut. It is under his orders that Gauntlet is drafted as the facility's drill instructor, after Gauntlet saves him from an attack by HYDRA in Iraq. Gyrich gives orders to cover up MVP's death. He makes arrangements to provide a special tutor to Trauma through Hank McCoy; the tutor is revealed to be depowered mutant Dani Moonstar, but the two don't get along well and Gyrich fires Moonstar for training Trauma to use his powers to help people with debilitating phobias instead of using these abilities as a weapon. After KIA's debacle, Gyrich had to take part in an inquiry involving the Initiative program, and gets into a heated argument with Iron Man in which Gyrich exclaims to Iron Man, "you've got Captain America's blood on your hands!". Apparently removed from his position after throwing out that sentence, he later makes a statement claiming at a press conference he had decided to "retire" to spend time with his family. When a reporter points out that Gyrich has no living family, he declines to elaborate.

Gyrich becomes the main antagonist for Kieron Gillen's and Steven Sander's new series S.W.O.R.D. where he joins S.W.O.R.D. (Sentient World Observation and Response Department) under Norman Osborn's orders and becomes the co-leader alongside Abigail Brand. In the first volume, Gyrich manages to kidnap several notable aliens including Noh-Varr, Adam X, Jazinda, Karolina Dean and Hepzibah, all in his desire to send aliens home. He also arrests both Brand and Lockheed. Gyrich survives an alien takeover of the installation simply by being too dosed on intruder-neutralization gas to be much of a threat. Brand, with the assistance of several super-powered beings, takes back the job and blackmails Gyrich into leaving S.W.O.R.D. alone.

While it is unknown if he was brainwashed by HYDRA or it was by his own will, Gyrich worked along HYDRA to control Dennis Dunphy and turn into the new Scourge to kill criminals and "fix the system". After Captain America tended him a trap, he was captured by S.H.I.E.L.D.

During the Civil War II storyline, Gyrich represented the United States as a member of the Alpha Flight Space Program's Board of Governors.

Other versions

Age of Apocalypse
In the "Age of Apocalypse" alternate timeline storyline, Gyrich is an anti-mutant suicide bomber who threatens to destroy Heaven, Angel's club. He is defeated by the Bedlam (comics)#Other versionsBedlam Brothers. He was returned in the current "Age of Apocalypse" on-going, as a leader in the human resistance. He lost his legs, in "the offensive to blow the Seattle power core", confining him to a wheelchair, and is seen helping evaluate the now powerless Jean Grey.

Mutant X
In the Mutant X comic, Gyrich is the government's liaison to the Avengers. He calls for the aid of The Six to search for Dracula after forces break the vampire out of the Vault prison. In this continuity, he again has a serious problem with Captain America.

Ultimate Marvel
The Ultimate Marvel iteration of Henry Gyrich visually looks like his mainstream counterpart albeit with blond hair. He works for the CIA, trying to establish a check and balance system for Nick Fury and the Ultimates in case. When a rapidly aged clone that was led to believe into being Dr. Richard "Ray" Parker, the clone's backstory included continuing the Venom project for Gyrich. However, it turns that the real Gyrich works instead for an FBI strike team to find Otto Octavius. During Peter Parker's and Spider-Woman's battle with Doctor Octopus, Fury distracts Gyrich by asking confusing questions and confronting him about the illegal Spider-Clone program of Spider-Man which had been going on behind S.H.I.E.L.D.

What If...?
In one issue of What If...?, Gyrich is summoned by the U.S. President to disrupt a rally led by Mary Richards, the daughter of Reed Richards and Susan Richards, and a philanthropic healer and activist, because the President fears the mounting popularity for her cause. Gyrich attempts to do so by disguising himself as Captain America and hiding agitators in the crowd; he manages to approach and critically stab Mary before he gets his hand broken by the Thing. But his plan severely backfires when Mary uses healing powers to quell the outbreaking violence amongst the crowd and, after making a full recovery, subsequently instigates the dissolution of the existing government system. Following that, Gyrich receives a visit from Captain America, who is out for revenge for Gyrich's abuse of his name and ideals.

In other media

Television
 Henry Gyrich appears in X-Men: The Animated Series, voiced by Barry Flatman. This version is against mutants. Throughout season one, he works with Bolivar Trask to oversee their Sentinel project until Master Mold betrays them. In the series finale "Graduation Day", Gyrich speaks at an anti-Mutant summit, where Professor X attempts to convince him that not all mutants are evil. Gyrich retaliates by attacking him with a sonic gun, nearly killing him and publicly revealing his mutant status. As the X-Men present rush to the latter's aid, Gyrich is dragged away by security guards while psychotically claiming that mutants are dangerous.
 Henry Gyrich appears in the Fantastic Four: World's Greatest Heroes episode "Imperious Rex", voiced by Don Brown.
 Henry Gyrich appears in The Avengers: Earth's Mightiest Heroes, voiced by Jim Ward. Following a minor appearance in the episode "Welcome to the Kree Empire", in which he receives a tour of S.W.O.R.D.'s base, the Damocles, it is revealed in "Prisoner of War" that he was captured by the Skrulls and replaced with one of their infiltrators at an unknown point in time before joining forces with Captain America and their fellow prisoners in escaping. In "Secret Invasion", the Skrull impersonating Gyrich plants a bomb in the Damocles, but Sydren detects it in time to alert S.W.O.R.D. and help the personnel evacuate.

Film
Henry Gyrich appears in X-Men, portrayed by Matthew Sharp. This version was an assistant to Senator Robert Kelly before being killed by the Brotherhood of Mutants and replaced by Mystique. In an early draft, he was going to be a supporting antagonist alongside the Sentinels and Bolivar Trask.

References

External links
 Henry Peter Gyrich at Marvel.com

Fictional characters from Pittsburgh
Fictional secret agents and spies
Marvel Comics characters
Comics characters introduced in 1977
Characters created by Jim Shooter
Characters created by John Byrne (comics)